Gazit is a Hebrew surname. It is the 930,678th most common surname in the world (2022)It may refer to:
Doron Gazit (born 1953), Israeli environmental artist, activist and industrial designer
Dov Gazit (1908–1986), chief-commander of the IAF (Israeli Air Force) Technical School 
Ehud Gazit, Israeli biochemist, biophysicist and nanotechnologist 
Eshy Gazit, music industry executive best known for his work as the CEO of Gramophone Media
Gabi Gazit (born 1947), Israeli journalist, television personality and radio host
Mark Gazit, expert on cybersecurity, business executive and serial entrepreneur
Mordechai Gazit (1922–2016), Israeli diplomat
Shlomo Gazit (born 1926), retired Israeli military officer and academic, President of Ben-Gurion University 
 Tomer Sisley (born Tomer Gazit; 1974), Israeli humorist, actor, screenwriter, comedian, and film director

Reference